Chicago Cares is a nonprofit organization that connects prospective volunteers with volunteer opportunities throughout Chicago. It was founded in 1991 by Leslie Bluhm and Mary Prchal and has mobilized more than 600,000 volunteers from all over Chicago. Chicago Cares is the largest volunteer organization service in the Midwest region. The organization hosts annual programs including the Serve-a-thon and a speed dating volunteer event. Their current mission statement is “Chicago Cares mobilizes volunteers to build a stronger, more unified Chicago.”

History 
Chicago Cares was founded in 1991 with the goal of encouraging working professionals to participate in short term volunteering projects that aligned with their work schedules.

Co-founders Leslie Bluhm and Mary Prchal created the organization because of a need to have an outlet to publicize volunteer opportunities. Upon creation, Chicago Cares partnered with nonprofit organizations to place volunteers with organizations. Leslie Bluhm currently serves on the board of directors. She is the daughter of American billionaire real estate and casino magnate Neil Bluhm. The current CEO, Jenne Myers assumed the role in 2013. Myers is the daughter of former Chicago Bears football player Jack Myers.

Along with New York Cares and Hands On Atlanta, Chicago Cares is a part of the HandsOn Network, a byproduct of Points Of Light organization.

Impact 
In 2017 Chicago Cares worked with 58 Chicago neighborhoods, 87 corporate sponsors, and 200 community partners. A total of 18,400 volunteers signed up on the Chicago Cares website. In 2016 Chicago Cares had a total revenue of $3,416,247. 7.2% of their revenue came from fundraising events and 92.8% came from contributions, gifts and grants.

On September 7, 2011 Chicago Cares and the Chicago White Sox commemorated the victims of 9/11 by supporting the restoration of McClellan Elementary School murals and landscaping. On September 18, 2018 Chicago Cares teamed up with the Resident Association of Great Englewood (RAGE) to create a recreational space in a vacant lot by donating $2500 for building materials that was used for murals, playground equipment, and a fire pit. On November 12, 2018 Chicago Cares and city clerk Anna Valencia organized a breakfast to honor military veterans for their service.

Signature Programs 
Chicago Cares services are free, using an online calendar to list volunteer opportunities available to members. Volunteers are required to attend one orientation event to participate in volunteer opportunities.

Serve a-thon

The largest event Chicago Cares sponsors is the annual Serve-a-thon, an event that includes volunteering, guest speakers, and celebrations to attract public engagement. The Serve-a-thon is Chicago's largest day of public service. In June 2018, Chicago Cares celebrated their 25th anniversary attended by 5,000 volunteers, that provided 20,000 hours of volunteering at 30 sites across Chicago.

Find Your Cause

Find Your Cause is another event sponsored by Chicago Cares Another event promoted as a “speed dating” type activity in which volunteers meet with local organization representatives to choose a potential cause that is right for them. More than 50 nonprofits participate in the event.

WomenOnCall Merger 
Chicago Cares absorbed WomenOnCall in an effort of expansion. WomenOnCall was founded by Margot Pritzker, wife of American billionaire Thomas Pritzker.  The Chicago-based nonprofit organization focuses on connecting professional women with volunteer opportunities that match their skills. Post-merger, WomenOnCall is now a component of Chicago Cares "Skills For Good" department. Bluhm stated that "By combining forces, we will be able to enhance our efforts to build the capacity of local nonprofit organizations while bringing people together across lines of difference through the volunteer experience."

References

External links 
 

Non-profit organizations based in Chicago
1991 establishments in Illinois
Organizations established in 1991